The Apostolic Vicariate of Nekemte is a Roman Catholic apostolic vicariate (pre-diocesan jurisdiction) located in Nekemte, Ethiopia (where Ethiopian Orthodox, Islam and Coptic Catholicism are predominant).

The see is directly subject to the Holy See (not part of any ecclesiastical province) and its Roman Congregation for the Evangelization of Peoples. Its seat is the Cathedral of Kidane Meheret, in Nekemte.

The Vicariate Apostolic of Nekemte comprises the following:

Oromia region:

 East Welega zone
 West Welega zone
 Kelem Welega zone
 Horo Guduru wollega zone
 West Showa Zone

Benishangul Gumuz Region:

 Assosa zone
 Kamashi zone

History 
 January 28, 1913: Established as Apostolic Prefecture of Southern Kaffa / Kaffa Meridionale (Italiano), on territory split off from the Apostolic Vicariate of Galla
 September 8, 1913: Renamed as Apostolic Prefecture of Kaffa
 March 25, 1937: Promoted as Apostolic Vicariate of Gimma, hence entitle to a titular bishop, having lost territory to establish the Apostolic Prefecture of Neghelli
 Lost territories on 1940.02.13 to establish Apostolic Prefecture of Hosanna and Apostolic Prefecture of Endeber
 September 3, 1982: Renamed after its see as Apostolic Vicariate of Nekemte / Nekemteën(sis) (Latin)
 Lost territory on 1994.06.10 to establish Apostolic Prefecture of Jimma–Bonga.

Statistics 
As per 2014, it pastorally served 46,900 Latin Catholics (0.6% of 7,831,000 total) on 98,792 km² in 93 parishes and 26 missions with 38 priests (30 diocesan, 8 religious), 6 deacons, 56 lay religious (14 brothers, 42 sisters) and 15 seminarians .

Bishops

Ordinaries
(all Roman rite; so far members of Latin missionary congregations)

Apostolic Prefect of Southern Kaffa  
 Father Gaudenzio Barlassina, Consolata Missionaries (I.M.C.) (May 6, 1913 – September 8, 1913 see below)

Apostolic Prefects of Kaffa  
 Father Gaudenzio Barlassina, I.M.C. (see above September 8, 1913 – 1933)
 Fr. Luigi Santa, I.M.C. (July 14, 1934 – March 15, 1937 see below)

Apostolic Vicars of Gimma  
 Luigi Santa, I.M.C. (see above March 15, 1937 – November 1943), appointed Auxiliary Bishop of Rimini, Italy
Apostolic Administrator Urbain-Marie Person, Capuchin Franciscans (O.F.M. Cap.) (1952–1958)
Apostolic Administrator Fr. Frans Janssen, Lazarists (C.M.) (1958 – May 21, 1959 see below)
 Frans Janssen, C.M. (see above May 21, 1959 – 1972)
 Apostolic Administrator Fr. Herman Wilhelm Teuben, C.M. (1972 – December 17, 1977)
 Hendrik Joseph Alois Bomers, C.M. (December 17, 1977 – September 3, 1982 see below)

Apostolic Vicars of Nekemte 
 Hendrik Joseph Alois Bomers, C.M. (see above September 3, 1982 – October 19, 1983), appointed Coadjutor Bishop of Haarlem, Netherlands
 Fikre-Mariam Ghemetchu, C.M. (October 28, 1985 – January 18, 1994)
 Leonardus Dobbelaar, C.M. (June 10, 1994 – March 21, 2008)
Apostolic Administrator Theodorus Van Ruijven, C.M. (July 2008 – July 23, 2009 see below)
 Theodorus Van Ruijven, C.M. (see above July 23, 2009 – November 10, 2013)
 Varghese Thottamkara, C.M. (first as Coadjutor Bishop; then as Bishop, November 10, 2013 – ...)

Coadjutor Vicar Apostolic
 Varghese Thottamkara, C.M. (June 28, 2013 - November 10, 2013 )

See also 
 List of Catholic dioceses in Ethiopia

References

External links 
 GCatholic.org - data for all sections
 Catholic Hierarchy 

Catholic dioceses in Ethiopia
Apostolic vicariates
Religious organizations established in 1913
Roman Catholic dioceses and prelatures established in the 20th century
Oromia Region
1913 establishments in Ethiopia